Ceratitis rosa, the Natal fruit fly or Natal fly, a species from the family Tephritidae of the order Diptera, is a fruit fly. It was described in 1887 from specimens of Delagoa Bay, Mozambique.

Morphology
Adult flies grow up to 4 to 7 mm long and usually have banded wings, with yellow and black patterns.

Distribution
The polyphagous African species known distribution is mainly southern and eastern Africa especially in Angola, DRC, Eswatini, Ethiopia, Kenya, Malawi, Mali, Mozambique, Nigeria, Rwanda, South Africa (KwaZulu-Natal), Tanzania, Uganda, Zimbabwe, and the islands of Mauritius and Reunion.

Host
In various regions of Africa, the pest is observed in over 100 species, of which, it is mostly found affecting arabica coffee, mango, papaya, guava and custard apple.

References

Further reading

Meyer, M. de. "On the identity of the Natal fruit fly Ceratitis rosa Karsch (Diptera, Tephritidae)." Bulletin de l'Institut Royal des Sciences Naturelles de Belgique, Entomologie 71 (2001): 55-62.

Endemic fauna of Mozambique
Dacinae
Agricultural pest insects
Insects described in 1887